A package tour, package vacation, or package holiday comprises transport and accommodation advertised and sold together by a vendor known as a tour operator. Other services may be provided such as a rental car, activities or outings during the holiday. Transport can be via automobile, buses, charter airline, and may also include travel between areas as part of the holiday. Package holidays are a form of product bundling.

Package holidays are organised by a tour operator and sold to a consumer by a travel agent. Some travel agents are employees of tour operators, others are independent.

History

Organised tours
The first organised tours dated back to Thomas Cook who, on 5 July 1841, chartered a train to take a group of temperance campaigners from Leicester to a rally in Loughborough, eleven miles away. By 1872 he was undertaking worldwide tours, albeit with small groups. His company, Thomas Cook & Son (commonly called Thomas Cook or simply "Cook's"), grew to become one of the largest and most well known travel agents before being nationalised in 1948.

With the gradual decline of visits to British seaside resorts after the Second World War, Thomas Cook & Son began promoting foreign holidays (particularly Italy, Spain and Switzerland) in the early 1950s. Information films were shown at town halls throughout Britain. However they made a costly decision by not going into the new form of cheap holidays which combined the transport and accommodation arrangements into a single 'package'. The company went further into decline and were only rescued by a consortium buy-out on 26 May 1972.

Group tours
Vladimir Raitz, the co-founder of the Horizon Holiday Group, pioneered the first mass package holidays abroad with charter flights between Gatwick airport and Corsica in 1950, and organised the first package holiday to Palma in 1952, Lourdes in 1953, and the Costa Brava and Sardinia in 1954. In addition, the amendments made in Montreal to the Convention on International Civil Aviation on 14 June 1954 was very liberal to Spain, allowing impetus for mass tourism using charter planes.

By the late 1950s and 1960s, these cheap package holidays — which combined flight, transfers, and accommodation — provided the first chance for most people in the United Kingdom to have affordable travel abroad. One of the first charter airlines was Euravia, which commenced flights from Manchester Airport in 1961 and Luton Airport in 1962. Despite opening up mass tourism to Crete and the Algarve in 1970, the package tour industry declined during the 1970s. On 15 August 1974, the industry was shaken by the collapse of the second-largest tour operator, Court Line, which operated under the brand names of Horizon and Clarksons. Nearly 50,000 tourists were stranded overseas and a further 100,000 people faced the loss of booking deposits.

In 2005 a growing number of consumers were avoiding package holidays and were instead travelling with budget airlines and booking their own accommodation. In the UK, the downturn in the package holiday market led to the consolidation of the tour operator market, which is now dominated by a few large tour operators. The major operators are Thomson Holidays and First Choice part of TUI AG and Thomas Cook AG. Under these umbrella brands are different holiday operators catering to different markets, such as Club 18-30 or traveleze. Budget airlines have also created their own package holiday divisions such as Jet2holidays or Japan Airlines's J-Pack special.

The trend for package holiday bookings saw a comeback in 2009, as customers sought greater financial security in the wake of a number of holiday and flight companies going bust, and as the hidden costs of 'no-frills' flights increased. Coupled with the search for late holidays as holidaymakers left booking to the last moment, this led to a rise in consumers booking package holidays.

Dynamic packaging

Dynamic packaging is a method that is becoming increasingly used in package holiday booking procedures that enables consumers to build their own package of flights, accommodation, and rental car instead of a pre-defined packages.

Dynamic Packaging allows guests to create their own vacation, similar to a private or custom tour. This method allows guests to use a company's itinerary or create their own to allow for more flexible options while using an agency's services.

See also
 Escorted tour
 Hotel consolidator
 Tourism

References

Types of tourism
Types of travel
Bundled products or services
British inventions
1841 introductions
1841 establishments in the United Kingdom